Robert Frank Ortegel (born September 15, 1940 in Evanston, Illinois) was the color commentator for Dallas Mavericks television broadcasts. Ortegel had previously been head coach for Drake University's men's basketball team, leading the team to its most recent appearance in the NIT in 1981. After concluding his collegiate career at Bradley University, he began coaching at Mossville Grade School. During the school year of 1964-64 Bob was the Head Baseball and Basketball Coach at Mason City High School, Mason City, Illinois. During the mid-80s he worked in franchising for Showbiz Pizza Place, Inc.

On February 8, 2011 it was announced that he and the Mavericks would part ways after 23 years.

On January 27, 2012, the Mavericks awarded Ortegel a championship ring after their win over the Utah Jazz.

Head coaching record

References

External links

1940 births
Living people
American color commentators
American men's basketball players
Basketball coaches from Illinois
Basketball players from Illinois
Bradley Braves men's basketball players
Drake Bulldogs men's basketball coaches
Illinois State Redbirds men's basketball coaches
High school basketball coaches in the United States
National Basketball Association broadcasters
Northern Michigan Wildcats men's basketball coaches
Sportspeople from Evanston, Illinois